Sripati Mishra (4 December 1923 – 8 December 2002)  was an Indian politician belonging to Indian National Congress. He served as Chief Minister of Uttar Pradesh during the 1980s.

Birth
Sripati Mishra was born in a Brahmin family in Sheshpur village in Sultanpur.

Political career
Sripati Mishra was first elected to Vidhan Sabha and became its speaker in 1980. He remained in this office from 7 July 1980 till 18 July 1982.
He became Chief Minister after resignation of Vishwanath Pratap Singh in 1982. He remained in office from 19 July 1982 till 3 August 1984. Dr Yogendra Narain served as his  Principal Secretary.  Later, he was elected to the Lok Sabha in 1984.

He was among a few politicians who reached the top slot in the state from village politics.

Also, he was senior member of the Uttar Pradesh Bar Council.

Death
Sripati Mishra died at the Balrampur Hospital, Lucknow after a prolonged illness.

Other
A college, Pt. Sripati Mishra Degree College in Tawakkalpur Nagara (Surapur), Kadipur, Sultanpur, Uttar Pradesh has been founded in his memory and currently this college is one of the best educational institute in district.

References

External links
 Chief Ministers of Uttar Pradesh

Indian National Congress politicians
People from Sultanpur district
Chief Ministers of Uttar Pradesh
1923 births
2002 deaths
Uttar Pradesh MLAs 1980–1985
India MPs 1984–1989
Speakers of the Uttar Pradesh Legislative Assembly
Deputy Speakers of the Uttar Pradesh Legislative Assembly
Chief ministers from Indian National Congress
People from Jaunpur district
Indian National Congress politicians from Uttar Pradesh